is a small public university in Tottori, Tottori Prefecture, Japan. It is under the jurisdiction of the city and prefecture of Tottori.

History
April, 2001 - Opening 
2005 - Establishment of Ecoinformatics Graduate Research Department, featuring a masters program in Ecoinformatics. Particular areas of study include Environmental sociology, Environmental design, and Information Systems.

Departments
Faculty of Environmental Studies;
Faculty of Business Administration;
Humanities Center

Graduate school
Ecoinformatics Research Course

Public universities in Japan
Universities and colleges in Tottori Prefecture
Environmental studies institutions in Japan
Educational institutions established in 2001
2001 establishments in Japan
Tottori (city)